Hovratt ehl Cheikh Sid'Elemine is a village and commune in Mauritania.

Hovratt ehl Cheikh Sid'Elemine nearest to Kiffa capital of Assaba Region.
The village Founded at the end of the nineteenth century and early twentieth century, and then witnessed displacement of population in the first half of the twentieth century, and it was reborn in the late of 1984 by initiative of Hassan Ould Bou how's a businessman from the village, with a number of notables people of Sheikh Elemine tribe, the mosque and minaret was first the foundations of the village was built in the early of 1986.

References 

Regional capitals in Mauritania
Communes of Assaba Region